Ihor Zaytsev is the name of:

 Ihor Zaytsev (basketball) (born 1989), Ukrainian basketball player
 Ihor Zaytsev (footballer) (1934–2016), Ukrainian Soviet footballer